Sombath is a given name and surname. Notable people with the name include:

Alice Sombath (born 2003), French footballer
Sombath Somphone (born 1952), Lao community development worker

Lao-language surnames